Helen Jennifer Denman (born 4 September 1976) is an Australian breaststroke swimmer of the 1990s, who won a silver medal in the 4×100-metre medley relay at the 1996 Summer Olympics. She won an individual silver medal in the 100-metre breaststroke at the 1998 World Aquatics Championships.

Denman qualified for her first international team at the Australian Championships in 1996, after winning the 100-metre breaststroke.
At the 1996 Summer Olympics in Atlanta, Denman placed 11th in the 100-metre breaststroke, but fellow Australian Samantha Riley won the bronze medal. This meant that Denman swum the breaststroke leg in the heats of the 4×100-metre medley relay, before being replaced by Riley in the team that trailed the United States team home in the final.

Competing in front of a partisan home crowd at the 1998 World Championships in Perth, Denman set a personal best in winning silver in the 100-metre breaststroke, pushing American Kristy Kowal to within an arm's length. She also combined with Meredith Smith, Petria Thomas and Susie O'Neill in the final of the 4×100-metre medley relay to claim silver behind the Americans.

At the 1998 Commonwealth Games in Kuala Lumpur, Malaysia, Denman claimed gold in the 100 m breaststroke and the 4×100-metre medley relay. In 1999 she was omitted from the Australian national team, and in 2000 she made an unsuccessful attempt to qualify for the 2000 Summer Olympics in Sydney.

See also
 List of Olympic medalists in swimming (women)
 List of Commonwealth Games medallists in swimming (women)

References

1976 births
Australian female breaststroke swimmers
Living people
Olympic swimmers of Australia
Swimmers from Perth, Western Australia
Swimmers at the 1996 Summer Olympics
Olympic silver medalists for Australia
Commonwealth Games gold medallists for Australia
World Aquatics Championships medalists in swimming
People educated at St Hilda's Anglican School for Girls
Medalists at the 1996 Summer Olympics
Olympic silver medalists in swimming
Commonwealth Games medallists in swimming
Universiade medalists in swimming
Swimmers at the 1998 Commonwealth Games
Universiade silver medalists for Australia
Medalists at the 1995 Summer Universiade
20th-century Australian women
Medallists at the 1998 Commonwealth Games